Asansol Junction (station code: ASN) is a railway station of Eastern Railway in Asansol of Paschim Bardhaman district in the Indian state of West Bengal. The station is on the Howrah–Delhi main line. Around 171 trains pass through the station daily.
It serves Asansol and the surrounding areas.

Overview

Mining-industry zone
"The entire belt between Durgapur (158 km from Howrah), and all the way up to Dhanbad and beyond is industrialized. Apart from factories, there are many coalmines, some closed now, and some with fires burning deep in the mineshafts. Mining area extends for a large area, mostly to the south of the tracks. Quite a portion of the track passes through cuttings, where the surrounding area is higher than the track level, resulting in the profusion of characteristic small masonry bridges crossing the tracks." This description is from "Gomoh loco shed and CLW trip record" by Samit Roychoudhury.

History
During the middle of the nineteenth century, Carr, Tagore and Company transported coal from Narayankuri ghat on the Damodar River to Kolkata, then known as Calcutta. However, as the flow of water in the river was inconsistent, supplies were irregular.

The East Indian Railway needed land to develop the infrastructure for the railways. While the Searsol Raj, then the zamindar in the Raniganj area, refused to provide the land, the Panchakot Raj, then functioning from Kashipur, agreed to provide the land in Shergarh, of which Asansol was then a part in 1863–64, East Indian Railway purchased a large area of jungle land from the Panchakot Raj, thereby initiating the development of Asansol as an industrial area.

Subsequently, Asansol gained further in importance. What was later known as the Sahibganj loop was the first line from Kolkata to Delhi and the first direct train started in 1866, but the shorter line via Asansol and Jhajha came up in 1871. It was initially called the Chord line but as it attracted more traffic, was rechristened the main line and the earlier main line became Sahibganj loop. With the completion of the –Gaya–Mughalsarai Grand Chord in 1901 (formally inaugurated in 1906 and finally opened in 1907), the Kolkata–Delhi rail distance became even shorter, and Asansol started functioning as the junction station of the main and chord lines, as Sitarampur, the actual junction, near Asansol, is a comparatively smaller station.

While momentous developments were taking place in connecting Delhi and Kolkata by rail, Bengal Nagpur Railway extended its tracks to the Asansol coal belt in 1887, thus connecting Adra with Asansol.

The railway establishment at Asansol contributed substantially to its development and growth.

Electrification
Electrification of the railways gained momentum in the early fifties. Although initial installations were with 3 kV DC traction, the railways subsequently adopted the 25 kV AC system.  Electrification of the Bardhaman–Mughalsarai section was completed in 1957 and the Howrah–Gaya stretch was electrified by around 1960. The Tatanagar–Adra–Asansol section was electrified in the 1957–1962 period.

Locomotive shed
Asansol Electric Loco Shed is home to the oldest electric locomotive shed of Indian Railways. It houses WAP-4, WAG-5, WAM-4 and WAG-7.

Asansol Division
Established in 1925, Asansol Division is one of the oldest divisions of Indian Railways. On the Howrah–Delhi main line, its jurisdiction extends from the distant signal of Khana junction to the distant signal of Jhajha . On the Grand Chord line its jurisdiction extends up to the distant signal of Pradhankhunta. Branch lines under its jurisdiction are: Andal–Sainthia, Andal–Tapasi–Barabani–Sitarampur, Madhupur–Giridih, Jasidih–Baidyanathdham and Jasidih–Dumka. With a total of 565 route kilometers, the division has quadruple lines (two up and two down line) from Khana to Sitarampur. It handles 100 mail/express trains daily and 212 passenger train runs per day. The number of originating passengers per day is 144,070.

Passenger movement
Asansol is amongst the top hundred booking stations of Indian Railway. 152 trains (including weeklies and bi-weeklies) originate or pass through Asansol railway station. All trains including Sealdah Rajdhani, Howrah Rajdhani, Howrah Duronto, Sealdah Humsafar Express, Yuva Express and Shalimar Duronto stops at Asansol Junction except Sealdah Duronto

Amenities

Asansol railway station has three double-bedded AC retiring rooms, two double-bedded non-AC retiring rooms and an eight-bedded dormitory. Escalators are present at platforms no. 2 and 7. WiFi service is available here. A food plaza in the station premises is open 24/7. It also has an air-conditioned premium lounge for upscale passengers.

Gallery

References

External links

 Trains at Asansol

Railway stations in Paschim Bardhaman district
Railway junction stations in West Bengal
Asansol railway division
Railway stations opened in 1864
Transport in Asansol